is a Japanese speed skater. She competed at the 1976 Winter Olympics and the 1980 Winter Olympics.

References

External links

1955 births
Living people
Japanese female speed skaters
Olympic speed skaters of Japan
Speed skaters at the 1976 Winter Olympics
Speed skaters at the 1980 Winter Olympics
Sportspeople from Hokkaido
20th-century Japanese women
21st-century Japanese women